The following is a list of landforms and other geographical features located within the political boundaries of Sussex County in northwestern New Jersey in the United States.

Mountains and hills

Ridge and Valley Appalachians physiographic province
 Kittatinny Mountain
 Culver Ridge
 High Point (New Jersey)
 Bird Mountain (New Jersey)
 Blue Mountain (New Jersey)
 Rattlesnake Mountain (New Jersey)
 Sunrise Mountain (New Jersey)
 Paradise Mountain (New Jersey)
 Wallpack Ridge

Highlands physiographic province
 Allamuchy Mountain
 Cage Hill
 Hamburg Mountains (New Jersey)
 Wawayanda Mountain
 Lookout Mountain (New Jersey)
 Maple Hill (New Jersey)
 Pimple Hills
 Pochuck Mountain
 Rutan Hill
 Smiths Hill
 Sparta Mountains
 Sterling Hill (New Jersey)

Valleys
 Kittatinny Valley
 Wallkill Valley
 Wallpack Valley

Rivers and streams

 Wallkill River
 Papakating Creek
 West Branch Papakating Creek
 Neepaulakating Creek
 Clove Brook
 Pequannock River
 Pequest River
 Pochuck Creek
 Black Creek (New Jersey)
 Wawayanda Creek
 Delaware River
 Flat Brook
 Tillmans Brook
 Big Flat Brook
 Little Flat Brook
 Paulins Kill
 Dry Brook
 Culver Brook (West Branch Paulins Kill)
 Nelden Brook
 Musconetcong River
 Lubbers Run
 Punkhorn Creek

Lakes and ponds
 Brau Kettle
 Culver's Lake
 Lake Hopatcong
 Lake Lackawanna
 Lake Mohawk
 Lake Musconetcong
 Lake Owassa
 Muckshaw Ponds

See also
 Sussex County Snow Belt

Protected areas
 Delaware Water Gap National Recreation Area
 High Point State Park
 Stokes State Forest
 Swartswood State Park
 Kittatinny Valley State Park
 Wawayanda State Park
 Wallkill River National Wildlife Refuge

External links
 County of Sussex (government website)